Richard Scott Harmon is a Canadian actor. His roles on television include John Murphy in The CW's The 100, Jasper Ames in The Killing and Julian Randol on Continuum. Harmon received critical praise for his role in the movie If I Had Wings.

Early life
Richard Harmon was born in Mississauga, Ontario, Canada. His parents are director Allan Harmon and producer Cynde Harmon; his sister is actress Jessica Harmon.

Career
Harmon made his acting debut in the 2002 television series Jeremiah.

Filmography

Television

References

External links

 

Canadian male film actors
Canadian male television actors
Canadian people of Italian descent
Canadian LGBT rights activists
Living people
Male actors from Ontario
Male feminists
People from Mississauga
Year of birth missing (living people)